Dragomir A. Cioroslan  (born 15 May 1954) is an Olympian retired middleweight weightlifter born in Romania. He has lived in the United States since 1990. He competed at the 1976, 1980 and 1984 Olympics and won a bronze medal in 1984. Cioroslan won 10 national championships titles in his native Romania from 1974 to 1983. Besides weightlifting he participated in bodybuilding competitions. Between 1985 and 1990 he served as deputy secretary general and national coaching director of the Romanian Weightlifting Federation. In 1990 Cioroslan moved to the United States and worked as national resident program coach from 1990 to 2003. From 1993 to 2003 Cioroslan served as USA Weightlifting's national coach at World Championships, 1993–2003, Pan American Games coach in 1995 and 1999 as well as USA Weightlifting's head Olympic team coach at 1996 and 2000 Olympic Games. Served on the USOC Sport Science and Technology from 1993-2003. 
In 2006 Cioroslan was named to the position of Director of International Strategies and Development at the United States Olympic and Paralympic Committee. In 1998 Cioroslan co-authored the book Banish Your Belly, Rodale Press, with Kenton Robinson. From 1998 to 2009 Cioroslan was a contributing writer to the Encyclopædia Britannica, Britannica Book of the Year.

References

External links 
 
 
 

1954 births
Living people
Olympic weightlifters of Romania
Weightlifters at the 1984 Summer Olympics
Weightlifters at the 1980 Summer Olympics
Weightlifters at the 1976 Summer Olympics
Romanian expatriate sportspeople in the United States
Olympic bronze medalists for Romania
Olympic medalists in weightlifting
Medalists at the 1984 Summer Olympics
Romanian male weightlifters
Sportspeople from Cluj-Napoca